Sophie Bloom (née Hensser) is an Australian actress. From 2001 to 2002, she played Megan in The Saddle Club. In 2009, she joined Australian soap opera Home and Away in the recurring role of Freya Duric. Following guest appearances in various television dramas, Hensser joined the main cast of Love Child as Vivian Maguire in 2014. She appeared in every season until its cancellation in 2017.

Career
Hensser is the daughter of actress Wendy Strehlow. While growing up Hensser was on sets and tours with her parents. Strehlow agreed to Hensser having an agent on the condition that she did not take rejection after auditions personally. Hensser had credited her mother as helping her to stay "grounded" as an actress. Hensser trained at the Australian Theatre for Young People and also participated in an open course from the National Institute of Dramatic Art.

In 2009, she began appearing in a guest role on Seven Network soap opera Home and Away, during the 22nd season, as Freya Duric, the girlfriend of Xavier Austin (David Jones-Roberts). She is perhaps best remembered on the show for a scene which involved her kissing Nicole Franklin (Tessa James).

In 2011, Hensser began playing Tamara in the stage production of Lachlan Philpott's Silent Disco. Hensser told Elissa Blake from The Sydney Morning Herald that her character was the "epitome of teenage angst". The play received critical acclaim, but was a failure at the box office. In December that year, it was announced that Hensser had begun filming a regular role in the Nine Network drama series Tricky Business, playing Lily Christie. Hensser took part in the 2012 Dungog Film Festival and read for Diving For Poland at the Cockatoo theatre.

In 2013, Hensser joined the cast of Nine Network drama series Love Child. In December 2017, Love Child was cancelled after four seasons.

Personal life
Hensser married her partner of eight years, Danny Bloom in Byron Bay in 2016. She gave birth to their first child, a son, in October 2018.

Filmography

Film

Television

References

External links
 

Australian television actresses
Living people
Year of birth missing (living people)
Australian film actresses